Eoin Murchan (born 1996) is an Irish Gaelic footballer who plays for the Na Fianna club and at senior level for the Dublin county team.

Murchan did not start the 2019 All-Ireland Senior Football Championship Final, which finished in a draw. He was then named from the start in the replay, and scored a goal straight from the second-half throw-in by racing straight for the Kerry goal, hitting the ball into the right corner of the net. Joe Brolly later described Murchan's goal as "arguably the most important moment in the history of Dublin football". Murchan received The Throw-In's final Rising Star award of the competition as a result.

Murchan is a pianist.

References

1996 births
Living people
Dublin inter-county Gaelic footballers
Gaelic football backs
Sportspeople from Dublin (city)